Will Pericak (born December 30, 1989) is a former American football guard. He played college football at Colorado.

Professional career

Baltimore Ravens
Pericak was an undrafted free agent signed by the Baltimore Ravens. He was later released by the Ravens.

San Diego Chargers
Pericak was signed to the Chargers practice squad on September 2, 2013.

Jacksonville Jaguars
On December 23, 2013, he was signed to the Jacksonville Jaguars' practice squad. He was signed to the active roster at the conclusion of the 2013 regular season.

Denver Broncos
Pericak signed with the Denver Broncos during the 2014 offseason, but was waived by the Broncos on August 24, 2014.

Seattle Seahawks
On February 6, 2015, he signed a futures contract to the Seattle Seahawks. On September 6, 2015, Pericak was signed to the Seattle Seahawks practice squad.

On September 3, 2016, Pericak was released by the Seahawks as part of final roster cuts and was re-signed to the practice squad. He signed a reserve/future contract with the Seahawks on January 16, 2017.

On September 2, 2017, Pericak was waived by the Seahawks.

Buffalo Bills
On September 4, 2017, Pericak was signed to the Buffalo Bills' practice squad. He was released on November 6, 2017, but was re-signed five days later. He was released on November 27, 2017.

Chicago Bears
On December 5, 2017, Pericak was signed to the Chicago Bears' practice squad. He signed a reserve/future contract with the Bears on January 1, 2018. He was waived on September 1, 2018.

San Diego Fleet
On November 9, 2018, Pericak signed with the San Diego Fleet of the Alliance of American Football (AAF) for the 2019 season. He decided to retire after seeing how the league was set up.

External links
Colorado Buffaloes bio

References

1989 births
Living people
American football defensive ends
Baltimore Ravens players
Colorado Buffaloes football players
Denver Broncos players
Jacksonville Jaguars players
Players of American football from Colorado
San Diego Chargers players
San Diego Fleet players
Seattle Seahawks players
Sportspeople from Boulder, Colorado